Takayuki Tada (多田 高行, born April 7, 1988) is a Japanese football player.

Club statistics
Updated to 23 February 2016.

References

External links

1988 births
Living people
National Institute of Fitness and Sports in Kanoya alumni
Association football people from Kagawa Prefecture
Japanese footballers
J2 League players
Giravanz Kitakyushu players
Association football midfielders